The State Bar of New Mexico (SBNM) is the integrated (mandatory) bar association of the U.S. state of New Mexico.

History 

The State Bar of New Mexico first met on January 19, 1886 in Santa Fe, New Mexico as a voluntary professional organization. There were 29 original members, and William A. Vincent was the first president.

In 1925, state statute caused the State Bar to operate as an agency of the New Mexico Supreme Court.
In 1978, the State Bar of New Mexico (State Bar) was incorporated under the laws of the State of New Mexico.

Structure
The SBNM is governed by a Board of Bar Commissioners, consisting of 19 members elected by district and one from each of the Senior Lawyer, Young Lawyer, and Paralegal Divisions. 

SBNM enforces the rule that New Mexico lawyers must complete 12 credits of Continuing Legal Education each year. 

SBNM publishes the weekly New Mexico Bar Bulletin and the quarterly New Mexico Lawyer.

In 1995, SBNM's Paralegal Division was established to serve the needs of New Mexico legal assistants.

References

New Mexico
Government of New Mexico
1886 establishments in New Mexico Territory
Organizations established in 1886